Bennett Creek or Bennett's Creek is a  tributary of the Nansemond River in Suffolk, Virginia.

Bennett's Creek Park offers two free boat ramps that access the Nansemond River, a playground, tennis courts, restrooms, three covered shelters that can be reserved for use, a nature trail, open fields, a fishing and crabbing pier with handicap accessible features, and plenty of fresh air and sunshine. A  canoe trail begins at the park boat ramp, passing through a tranquil salt marsh. Otter, raccoon, and nesting osprey are some of the wildlife viewing opportunities. The trail terminates at the confluence of the Nansemond River.

History
Prior to the Jamestown landing, the Bennett Creek area was populated by Nansemond Indians.  A series of land grants beginning June 26, 1635, handed the land around Bennett Creek to a group of Puritans led by Richard and Robert Bennett.  Richard Bennett later became the first Puritan governor of Virginia after the English Civil War.  His home was located on Bennett Creek; today a historical marker indicates the location.

In 1637 Nansemond County was formed including the Bennett Creek area. The county was first called Upper Norfolk County, but in 1646 it was renamed Nansemond for the Indian tribe.

In May 1779 a skirmish between Virginia militia and English troops under Gen. Edward Matthews occurred at Hargrove's Tavern near Bennett Creek.  The English moved on to attack and burn Suffolk.

During the American Civil War, the Bennett Creek area was fortified with gun batteries.  But the area was captured by Union troops by May 1862 soon after the ironclad CSS Virginia failed to hold off the U.S. Navy at the Battle of Hampton Roads (aka Monitor-Merrimack) within sight of the mouth of Bennett Creek.

Detailed historical records of the area are sparse because Nansemond County court records were destroyed in three separate fires, the earliest of which consumed the house of the court clerk in April 1734 (where the records were kept at that time), and the last on 7 February 1866.

See also
List of rivers in Virginia

References

"Seventeenth Century Isle of Wight County, Virginia: A History of the County of Isle of Wight", John Bennett Bodie, Chicago Law Print. Co., Chicago, 1938.
Nansemond County , Library of Virginia

External links
Bennett's Creek Park
Friends of Bennett Creek
Bennett’s Creek Little League

Rivers of Virginia
Tributaries of the James River
Rivers of Suffolk, Virginia